Juanishi Orosco (born 1945) is an American artist. He is known for his prints and murals associated with the Chicano Movement. He is a member and co-founder of the Royal Chicano Air Force art collective. Major American art museums hold Orosco’s work in their collections, such as the Smithsonian American Art Museum, and murals by Orosco may be found across California.

Biography 
Juanishi Orosco was born in Sacramento in 1945. He attended California State University, Sacramento. In 1969, Orosco and similarly minded artists Jose Montoya, Esteban Villa, Ricardo Favela and Rudy Cuellar started the Royal Chicano Air Force. He and other RCAF members created posters for the United Farm Workers. Orosco has engaged in arts education and community outreach alongside the RCAF since its formation. His work was featured in the famous Chicano Art: Resistance and Affirmation exhibition in 1990-1993 alongside other major chicano artists.

Murals contributed to 

 Leyes, Chicano Park (1975). San Diego, California
 Mandala, Chicano Park (1975). San Diego, California
 Amphitheater Mural, Southside Park (1980). Sacramento, California
 Metamorphosis, 3rd and L Streets (1980). Sacramento, California
 The History of the Farmworker, CAPACES Leadership Institute (2013). Woodburn, Oregon
 Flight, Golden 1 Center (2018). Sacramento, California

Further reading 
Juanishi Orosco's website

Citations 

21st-century American artists
20th-century American artists
1945 births
Living people